The Samsung i8520 (also known as Beam, or previously Halo) is a projector-enabled smartphone produced by Samsung. The i8520 also contains an 8-megapixel camera, that can be used along with the projector to allow the user to project directly what is in front of the camera (similar to the action of an overhead projector). The camera is also able to record HD video at a resolution of 720p at 30 frame/s. The phone also offers local Wi-Fi connectivity, e-mail, and web browsing, as well as containing a built-in GPS receiver. It was released initially in Singapore on 17 July 2010 with the carrier StarHub.

Successor
In February 2012 the i8530 Galaxy Beam was presented at the Mobile World Congress in Barcelona. It has a 15 lumens projector inside and 8GB of internal memory. the phone is 12.5mm thick and weighs 145.3 grams. It will run Google's Android 2.3 Gingerbread OS, has a 1.0 GHz dual-core processor. An update to the newer version of Android 4.0 a.k.a. Ice Cream Sandwich is planned.

Other features

3.5 mm audio jack
Integrated DNSe (Digital Natural Sound Engine)
Social networking integration with live updates
Google Search, Maps, Gmail
YouTube, Google Talk integration
MP3/WMA/WAV/eAAC+ player
MP4/H.263/H.264/Xvid/DivX player
Image editor
TV out
Organizer
Voice memo
T9

See also
 Handheld projector
 Projector phone

References

External links
 Full specifications: http://www.gsmarena.com/samsung_i8520_galaxy_beam-3150.php

Android (operating system) devices
I8520|smartphones|GPS
Mobile phones introduced in 2010